The 1980 Embassy World Darts Championship was the third year that the British Darts Organisation had staged a world championship. Again the field was 24 players, with the top seeds receiving a bye to the last 16 stage. For the second successive year the tournament was staged at Jollees Cabaret Club in Stoke-on-Trent.

Defending champion John Lowe, who had released a book The Lowe Profile just before the event suffered a surprise defeat 0–2 to Cliff Lazarenko saying afterwards "If you miss your doubles in this one, you must expect to go out." Eric Bristow was then immediately installed as favourite to win the event and would meet another flamboyant character of the game in the final – Bobby George.

George, who was not invited to the qualifiers the previous year appeared in a sequined shirt and when arriving on the stage was presented with a candelabra to complete a Liberace effect. He also made the early running in the final leading 1–0, 2–1 and 3–2. The first six sets all went to a deciding leg until Bristow won the seventh 3–1 to establish a 4–3 set lead. In the next set at 2–2 in legs, George had a golden opportunity to level the match and take it to a decider, but bust his score and nonchalantly threw his third dart into the board before putting his darts into his top pocket in anticipation of Bristow checking out to win the title. Bristow did so.

Bristow later said: "This was the final that changed the game of darts forever. Before that the audiences were always quite subdued, there was never really a buzz around the place, but when Bobby and I played in that final every member of the audience got involved. Everybody quite simply was going mad. It was a pit of noise. He had his fans, I had mine and both wanted to out-shout each other.

Seeds
  John Lowe
  Eric Bristow
  Tony Brown
  Leighton Rees
  Bobby George
  Nicky Virachkul
  Jocky Wilson
  Ceri Morgan

Prize money
The prize fund was £15,000.

Champion: £4,500
Runner-Up: £2,000
3rd Place: £500
Semi-Finalists (2): £1,000
Quarter-Finalists (4): £500
Last 16 (8): £300
Last 24 (8): £200

Results

3rd place match (best of 3 sets)
 Cliff Lazarenko 88.02 0 – 2 Tony Brown  99.24

References

BDO World Darts Championships
BDO World Darts 1980
Bdo World Darts Championship, 1980
Bdo World Darts Championship